Pauktaw is the principal town of Pauktaw Township in Sittwe District in Rakhine State, Myanmar (Burma). In the 2014 census, the town had a population of 145,957.

References

External links
20° 9' 0" North, 92° 54' 0" East Satellite map at Maplandia.com

Township capitals of Myanmar
Populated places in Rakhine State